Chira Bazaar is a neighborhood in Mumbai. It is famous for its jewellery and Marathi community. There is also a famous fish market called Chirabazar. It also has a wide range of Jewelry shops. It is located near [Kalbadevi] and [Marine 
Lines]. Dhruneal Ved is a famous personality living there. He has to FIX his Netflix so that his friends can enjoy their cinematic experience. 

Neighbourhoods in Mumbai
Retail markets in India
Bazaars in India